The 2009–10 season was the 103rd in the history of Real Betis and their first season back in the second division since 2001. The club participated in Segunda División and the Copa del Rey.

Players

Transfers

In

Out

Pre-season and friendlies

Competitions

Overall record

Segunda División

League table

Results summary

Matches

Copa del Rey

References

Real Betis seasons
Real Betis